Kai Tapani Nieminen (born 11 May 1950 in Helsinki) is a Finnish writer and recipient of the Eino Leino Prize in 1999. He is also a renowned translator of Japanese literature.

References

1950 births
Living people
Writers from Helsinki
Finnish writers
Recipients of the Eino Leino Prize